Agelena borbonica is a spider species found in Réunion.

See also 
 List of Agelenidae species

References 

borbonica
Spiders of Réunion
Spiders described in 1863